White Lake is an all-sports, 540-acre lake in White Lake Township, Michigan.

It is the sixth largest lake in Oakland County.

Potawatomi, Chippewa and Ottawa Native Americans lived, traveled and camped in this area including on the shores of White Lake which they called “white” or “clear” and that is where the name of the lake and township originated.

References

External links

Lakes of Oakland County, Michigan
Lakes of Michigan